Đất Đỏ is a township (Thị trấn) and town and capital of Đất Đỏ District, Bà Rịa–Vũng Tàu province, in Vietnam.

It is located along National Route 55.

Populated places in Bà Rịa-Vũng Tàu province
Communes of Bà Rịa-Vũng Tàu province
District capitals in Vietnam
Townships in Vietnam